Eva Křížová (born 20 October 1966) is a Czech basketball player. She competed in the women's tournament at the 1988 Summer Olympics.

References

1966 births
Living people
Czech women's basketball players
Olympic basketball players of Czechoslovakia
Basketball players at the 1988 Summer Olympics
Sportspeople from Prague